Francisco "Fran" Javier Yeste Navarro (born 6 December 1979) is a Spanish retired footballer who played as an attacking midfielder or a left winger, and is a manager.

He spent 11 years of his professional career with Athletic Bilbao (19 counting the youth system), appearing in 353 official matches and scoring 59 goals.

Club career

Athletic Bilbao
Born in Basauri, Biscay, and a product of Athletic Bilbao's youth academy at Lezama, Yeste made his first-team debut on 7 February 1999, playing the full 90 minutes in a 0–2 away loss against Racing de Santander. He would appear in a further 13 games that and the following seasons combined, while mainly registered with the reserves.

From 2000–01 onwards, Yeste was used regularly in the main squad, scoring six La Liga goals during that year including two in a 4–0 home win over Real Oviedo on 10 December 2000. After regular displays in 2003–04 he won a callup for Spain, although he did not make his debut; he scored a career-best 11 goals in the latter campaign, with the Basques finishing fifth and qualifying to the UEFA Cup.

At times troubled with injuries, Yeste continued to appear prominently, playing all the league matches in 2006–07 as Athletic barely avoided relegation (17th) and scoring five goals in the process. A player of volatile temperament, he was also sent off five times from 2007 to 2009 and added 14 yellow cards, one of the ejections occurring after he pushed Real Madrid's Iker Casillas in a 2–5 home loss.

Yeste featured irregularly in the 2009–10 season, also being ousted by manager Joaquín Caparrós for more than one month. In the first match upon his return, a 0–2 loss at Atlético Madrid on 25 March 2010, he was booked; on 21 May, after his contract expired, he announced his departure from the club through his agent.

United Arab Emirates
On 19 June 2010, Yeste agreed to a two-year deal with Al Wasl FC. In March of the following year, during the 2010–11 Etisalat Emirates Cup semi-final against Al Ain FC, the opponents took the lead before the 50th minute (49:27) and, as they were still celebrating, he shot from the centre circle to score a goal that was described by Dutch news site Voetbal Stijl as "The fastest equalizer in the history of football" (49:54).

There was controversy surrounding the legality of the goal, as Yeste shot the ball directly without having the ball passed from the centre circle, whilst another player was inside it, but it was later confirmed as valid, as the ball hit the ground just before crossing the goal line, and the other player inside the circle was from Al Ain.

Later years
In July 2011, Yeste signed with Greek champions Olympiacos FC, reuniting with former Athletic Bilbao coach Ernesto Valverde. On 17 January 2012, his contract was mutually terminated; the following day, he returned to the United Arab Emirates and joined Baniyas SC for six months.

Honours
Basconia
Tercera División: 1997–98

Athletic Bilbao
Copa del Rey runner-up: 2008–09
Supercopa de España runner-up: 2009

Olympiacos
Superleague Greece: 2011–12

Spain U20
FIFA World Youth Championship: 1999

References

External links

1979 births
Living people
People from Basauri
Spanish footballers
Footballers from the Basque Country (autonomous community)
Association football midfielders
La Liga players
Segunda División B players
Tercera División players
CD Basconia footballers
Bilbao Athletic footballers
Athletic Bilbao footballers
UAE Pro League players
Al-Wasl F.C. players
Baniyas Club players
Super League Greece players
Olympiacos F.C. players
Spain youth international footballers
Spain under-21 international footballers
Basque Country international footballers
Spanish expatriate footballers
Expatriate footballers in the United Arab Emirates
Expatriate footballers in Greece
Spanish expatriate sportspeople in the United Arab Emirates
Spanish expatriate sportspeople in Greece
Spanish football managers
Segunda División B managers
CD Eldense managers
Sportspeople from Biscay